Jeffrey E. Perelman is the billionaire Founder, Chairman and CEO of the JEP Management holding company. He is the son of Raymond G. Perelman, and the younger brother of Ronald O. Perelman. He is primarily known for his investing and philanthropic activities.

Education
Jeffrey Perelman holds both a Bachelor of Science in Economics and an MBA from the Wharton School of the University of Pennsylvania. He studied general business, with a particular focus on finance.

Career
Through the JEP Management holding company, Jeffrey Perelman owns stakes in a variety of financial and industrial companies. He serves as Chief Executive Officer of DentalEZ Group, Columbia Dentoform, Schiller Grounds Care, Germantown Tool & Manufacturing Company, General Machine Corporation, United Ammunition Container and Mantis Europe.

He also serves as a Member of the American Advisory Board of Christie's International.

Philanthropy
Jeffrey Perelman's philanthropic activities include supporting various schools at the University of Pennsylvania and other Philadelphia institutions, including the School of Dental Medicine, School of Design, the Institute of Contemporary Art and the Children's Hospital of Philadelphia. He is currently serving as the Secretary of the Board of Trustees of the Children's Hospital of Philadelphia and a member of the Board of Trustees of the Dia Art Foundation.

Personal
Jeffrey Perelman is married to Marsha Reines Perelman.

References

Living people
American financiers
American philanthropists
American chief executives of financial services companies
Wharton School of the University of Pennsylvania alumni
Haverford School alumni
Jewish American philanthropists
American Orthodox Jews
Year of birth missing (living people)
21st-century American Jews